The 2016 Newcastle Knights season was the 29th in the club's history. Coached by Nathan Brown and co-captained by Trent Hodkinson, Tariq Sims and Jeremy Smith, they competed in the NRL's 2016 Telstra Premiership, finishing the regular season in 16th place (out of 16). In the pre-season the Knights competed in the 2016 Auckland Nines tournament, reaching the quarter-finals. Mid-way through the 2016 season the team had only one member selected to play in the 2016 State of Origin series.

Milestones
Round 1: David Bhana made his NRL debut for the club.
Round 1: Jaelen Feeney made his NRL debut for the club.
Round 1: Trent Hodkinson made his debut for the club, after previously playing for the Canterbury-Bankstown Bulldogs, captained his 1st game for the club and kicked his 1st goal for the club.
Round 1: Pat Mata'utia made his NRL debut for the club and scored his 1st career try.
Round 1: Pauli Pauli made his debut for the club, after previously playing for the Parramatta Eels.
Round 1: Daniel Saifiti made his NRL debut for the club and scored his 1st career try.
Round 1: Jacob Saifiti made his NRL debut for the club.
Round 1: Jeremy Smith captained his 1st game for the club.
Round 3: Cory Denniss made his NRL debut for the club and scored his 1st career try.
Round 3: Sam Mataora scored his 1st try for the club.
Round 3: Jarrod Mullen played his 200th game for the club, which was also his 200th career game.
Round 3: Mickey Paea made his debut for the club, after previously playing for Hull FC.
Round 5: Jacob Saifiti scored his 1st career try.
Round 6: The Knights won their 200th game at Hunter Stadium.
Round 6: Will Pearsall made his NRL debut for the club.
Round 6: Tariq Sims captained his 1st game for the club.
Round 7: Josh King made his NRL debut for the club.
Round 7: Jack Stockwell played his 50th career game.
Round 8: Sam Mataora played his 50th career game.
Round 8: Jeremy Smith played his 200th career game.
Round 9: Brock Lamb made his NRL debut for the club.
Round 10: Jack Cogger made his NRL debut for the club.
Round 11: Dane Gagai played his 100th career game.
Round 11: Trent Hodkinson scored his 1st try for the club.
Round 12: Pauli Pauli scored his 1st try for the club.
Round 13: Lachlan Fitzgibbon scored his 1st career try.
Round 14: Mitchell Barnett made his debut for the club, after previously playing for the Canberra Raiders.
Round 14: Brendan Elliot made his debut for the club, after previously playing for the Sydney Roosters, and scored his 1st try for the club.
Round 16: Mitchell Barnett scored his 1st career try.
Round 16: Trent Hodkinson scored his 500th career point.
Round 17: Trent Hodkinson kicked his 1st field goal for the club.
Round 21: David Bhana scored his 1st career try.
Round 21: Dane Gagai played his 100th game for the club.
Round 22: The Knights lost their 14th game in a row, breaking their 2005 season record of 13 losses in a row.
Round 24: Peter Mata'utia played his 50th career game.
Round 25: Dylan Phythian made his NRL debut for the club and scored his 1st career try.
Round 25: Jeremy Smith kicked his 1st goal for the club.

Squad

Transfers and Re-signings

Gains

Losses

Promoted juniors

Change of role

Re-signings

Player contract situations

Ladder

Jerseys and sponsors
In 2016, the Knights' jerseys were made by ISC and their major sponsor was Newpave Asphalt.

Fixtures

Auckland Nines

Squad: 1. Jake Mamo 2. Nathan Ross 3. Jaelen Feeney 4. Akuila Uate 6. Brock Lamb 7. Will Pearsall 8. Pauli Pauli 9. Tyler Randell (c) 10. Daniel Saifiti 11. Korbin Sims 12. Robbie Rochow (c) 13. Jacob Saifiti 14. Sione Mata'utia 15. Joseph Tapine 16. Tariq Sims (c) 17. Chanel Mata'utia 18. Danny Levi 19. Pat Mata'utia

Pre-season trials

Regular season

Source:
 FG – Field Goal
 GP – Golden Point extra time

Statistics

35 players used.

Source:

Representative honours

The following players appeared in a representative match in 2016.

Australian Schoolboys
Brodie Jones
Pasami Saulo

Fiji
Michael Potter (coach)
Daniel Saifiti
Korbin Sims
Akuila Uate

Indigenous All Stars
Dane Gagai

Junior Kiwis
Ken Tofilau

Malta
Ben Stone
Sam Stone

New South Wales Country
Tariq Sims

New South Wales Residents
Matt Lantry (assistant coach)

New South Wales under-16s
Tom Baker
Phoenix Crossland
Brock Gardner
Jock Madden

New South Wales under-18s
Brodie Jones
Pasami Saulo
Tom Starling

New South Wales under-20s
Jack Cogger
Cory Denniss

New Zealand
Danny Levi (19th man)

Tonga
Mickey Paea (18th man)

World All Stars
Trent Hodkinson (squad member)
Jeremy Smith

Individual honours

Teams and squads
Emerging Blues Camp
Tariq Sims

New South Wales Under-20s Origin Pathways Camp
Jack Cogger

Queensland Academy of Sport Emerging Origin Squad
Korbin Sims

Newcastle Knights awards

Player of the Year
National Rugby League (NRL) Player of the Year: Dane Gagai
Intrust Super Premiership NSW Player of the Year: Luke Yates
National Youth Competition (NYC) Player of the Year: Nick Meaney

Players' Player
National Rugby League (NRL) Players' Player: Sione Mata'utia
Intrust Super Premiership NSW Players' Player: Ken Tofilau
National Youth Competition (NYC) Players' Player: Nick Meaney

Coach's Award
National Rugby League (NRL) Coach's Award: Nathan Ross
Intrust Super Premiership NSW Coach's Award: Uiti Baker
National Youth Competition (NYC) Coach's Award: Joe Morris

Brian Carlson Club-Andrew Johns Medal
Pasami Saulo

References

Newcastle Knights seasons
Newcastle Knights season